Jakob Nielsen (born 5 October 1957) is a Danish web usability consultant, human–computer interaction researcher, and co-founder of Nielsen Norman Group. He was named the “guru of Web page usability” in 1998 by The New York Times and the “king of usability” by Internet Magazine.

Background
Jakob Nielsen was born 5 October 1957 in Copenhagen, Denmark. He holds a Ph.D. in 1988 in human–computer interaction from the Technical University of Denmark.

Nielsen's earlier affiliations include Bellcore (now known as Telcordia Technologies, formally Bell Communications Research), teaching at the Technical University of Denmark, and the IBM User Interface Institute at the Thomas J. Watson Research Center.

Career

Sun Microsystems
From 1994 to 1998, he was a Sun Microsystems Distinguished Engineer. He was hired to make heavy-duty enterprise software easier to use, since large-scale applications had been the focus of most of his projects at the phone company and IBM. But luckily the job definition of a Distinguished Engineer is "you're supposed to be the world's leading expert in your field, so you figure out what would be most important for the company for you to work on." Therefore, Dr. Nielsen ended up spending most of his time at Sun defining the emerging field of web usability. He was the usability lead for several design rounds of Sun's website and intranet (SunWeb), including the original SunWeb design in 1994.

Nielsen Norman Group 

After his regular articles on his website about usability research attracted media attention, he co-founded usability consulting company Nielsen Norman Group (NN/g) of Fremont, California in 1998 with fellow usability expert Donald Norman. The company's vision is to help designers and other companies move toward more human-centered products and internet interactions, as experts and pioneers in the field of usability.

Other activities
Nielsen is on the editorial board of Morgan Kaufmann Publishers' book series in Interactive Technologies.

Nielsen writes a fortnightly newsletter, Alertbox, on web design matters and has published several books on the subject of web design.

Contributions
Nielsen founded the usability engineering movement for efficient and affordable improvements of user interfaces and he has invented several usability methods, including heuristic evaluation. He holds more than a thousand United States patents, mainly on ways of improving usability for technology.

In the early 1990s, Nielsen popularized the principle that five test users per usability test session is enough, allowing numerous tests at various stages of the development process. His argument is that "elaborate usability tests are a waste of resources." Once it is found that a few people are totally confused by a home page, little is gained by watching more people suffer through the same flawed design."

Jakob's law 
 Users will anticipate what an experience will be like, based on their mental models of prior experiences on websites. When making changes to a design of a website, try to minimize changes in order to maintain an ease of use.

Nielsen's law of internet bandwidth 
 Nielsen gave his name to Nielsen's law, in which he stated that network connection speeds for high-end home users would increase 50% per year, or double every 21 months. As a corollary, he noted that, since this growth rate is slower than that predicted by Moore's Law of processor power, user experience would remain bandwidth-bound.

Nielsen's usability heuristics 

 Nielsen's list of ten heuristics is probably the most-used usability framework for user interface design. An early version of the heuristics appeared in two papers by Nielsen and Rolf Molich  published in 1989-1990. Nielsen published an updated set in 1994, and the final set still in use today was published in 2005: 

 Visibility of system status
 Match between system and the real world
 User control and freedom
 Consistency and standards
 Error prevention
 Recognition rather than recall
 Flexibility and efficiency of use
 Aesthetic and minimalist design
 Help users recognize, diagnose, and recover from errors
 Help and documentation

In his book Usability Engineering (1993), Nielsen also defined the five quality components of his "Usability Goals":

 Learnability
 Efficiency
 Memorability
 Errors (as in low error rate)
 Satisfaction

Mobile usability 
On January 25, 2010, Nielsen decided to venture into designing a mobile application. He took to the internet as he was stumped how to test the application because he was faced with a strange scenario, the users will initially be novice and then become experts quickly as they will be using the app so frequently. Nielsen was stumped as he compared expert behavior to automated behavior.

iPad (1st generation; 2010) usability 
In 2010 and 2011, Nielsen wrote about iPad usability issues (specifically with the first generation of iPads) and identified problems with touch points that were too small, issues of discoverability, and “swipe ambiguity.” He expected to see more micropayment implementation (similar to the design of Microsoft's Xbox Live). In 2011, after one year of iPad's release of third party apps, Nielsen saw dramatic improvements and an increase of ease of use.

Windows 8 usability 
Nielsen has been quoted in the computing and the mainstream press for his criticism of Microsoft's Windows 8 (2012) user interface. Tom Hobbs, creative director of the design firm Teague, criticized what he perceived to be some of Nielsen's points on the matter, and Nielsen responded with some clarifications. The subsequent short and troubled history of Windows 8, released on October 26, 2012, seems to have confirmed Nielsen's criticism: the sales of Windows-based systems plummeted after the introduction of Windows 8; Microsoft released a new version, Windows 8.1, on Oct 18,2013, to fix the numerous problems identified in Windows 8, and later released Windows 10, a complete overhaul, in July 2015.

Recognition and awards 
In 2010, Nielsen was listed by Bloomberg Businessweek among 28 "World's Most Influential Designers".

In recognition of Nielsen's contributions to usability studies, in 2013 SIGCHI awarded him the Lifetime Practice Award.

Criticisms 
As Nielsen's newsletter and website grew, and with his use of "acronomic platitudes" to describe his concepts, it has been thought by some that much of Nielsen's work was more about marketing himself than rooted in research.

Nielsen's usability heuristics 
In 1990, when the Nielsen heuristic evaluation guidelines were created (Nielsen and Molich, 1990), user interface was less complicated than it is in present-day. There has never been any research-based validation of Nielsen's heuristics. The University of Calgary published an article in 2008, questioning if the Nielsen heuristics were an oversimplification.

Nielsen has been criticized by some visual designers and graphic designers for failing to balance the importance of other user experience considerations such as typography, readability, visual cues for hierarchy and importance, and eye appeal.

Responsive design 
Nielsen's 2012 guidelines, "Repurposing vs Optimized Design"  that web sites made for mobile devices be designed separately from their desktop-oriented counterparts has come under fire from Webmonkey's Scott Gilbertson, as well as Josh Clark writing in .net magazine, and Opera's Bruce Lawson, writing in Smashing Magazine, and other technologists and web designers who advocate responsive web design. In an interview with .net magazine, Nielsen explained that he wrote his guidelines from a usability perspective, not from the viewpoint of implementation.

Nielsen has been accused of taking a "puritanical" approach to usability, and not being able to keep up his usability evaluations in step of technological changes.

Bibliography

Books 
Nielsen's published books include:

Articles 
This is a select list of Nielsen's published research, which includes:

See also
 Usability
 Web design

References

External links
 

Video: Mobile Usability Futures, Jakob Nielsen, Talks at Google (2013), by Google Inc, on YouTube 
 techhive.com 
 businessinsider.com
 Want Magazine interview (video, 2010)

1957 births
Living people
People from Copenhagen
Technical University of Denmark alumni
Danish computer scientists
Academic staff of the Technical University of Denmark
Danish emigrants to the United States
American computer scientists
IBM employees
Sun Microsystems people
Human–computer interaction researchers
Usability